Muhamad Kasim Botan (born 14 April 1997) is an Indonesian professional footballer who plays as a winger for Liga 1 club Bhayangkara.

Club career

Persita Tangerang
He was signed for Persita Tangerang to play in Liga 1 in the 2021 season. Botan made his league debut on 7 January 2022 in a match against Persib Bandung at the Ngurah Rai Stadium, Denpasar.

Bhayangkara
Botan was signed for Bhayangkara to play in Liga 1 in the 2022–23 season. He made his league debut on 24 July 2022 in a match against Persib Bandung at the Wibawa Mukti Stadium, Cikarang. On 23 December, Botan made his first league goal for the club in Liga 1, opening the scoring in a 1–0 won against Arema at the Manahan Stadium.

On 9 January 2023, Botan scored the decisive goal in a 0–1 away win against PSIS Semarang at the Jatidiri Stadium, he was also selected as man of the match in that match.

Career statistics

Club

References

External links
 Kasim Botan at Soccerway
 Kasim Botan at Liga Indonesia

1997 births
Living people
Indonesian footballers
Sportspeople from East Nusa Tenggara
Liga 2 (Indonesia) players
Liga 1 (Indonesia) players
Persepam Madura Utama players
Persid Jember players
Persiba Bantul players
PSCS Cilacap players
Persita Tangerang players
Bhayangkara F.C. players
Association football forwards